Kihlstedt is a surname. Notable people with the surname include:

Carla Kihlstedt (born 1971), American composer, violinist, vocalist, and multi-instrumentalist
Magnus Kihlstedt (born 1972), Swedish footballer
Rya Kihlstedt (born 1970), American actress
Sigurd Kihlstedt (1897–1953), Swedish military surgeon

See also
Kohlstedt